Michael Maples could refer to: 

Michael D. Maples (born 1949), United States Army General
Mike Maples Jr., co-founder of the Floodgate Fund